PEP carboxylase may refer to:
 Phosphoenolpyruvate carboxylase, an enzyme
 Phosphoenolpyruvate carboxykinase (diphosphate), an enzyme